Creston is an unincorporated community in Ashe County, North Carolina, United States, southwest of Grayson. It lies at an elevation of 2,861 feet (872 m).  The ZIP Code for Creston is 28615.

Worth's Chapel was listed on the National Register of Historic Places in 1976.

References

Unincorporated communities in Ashe County, North Carolina
Unincorporated communities in North Carolina